The Peru national football team has experienced a series of indiscipline scandals since the 1990s.

Miramar scandal (1996)
In 1996, during the 1998 FIFA World Cup qualification season, players Nolberto Solano, Roberto Farfán, Percy Olivares, and Juan Marengo were caught drinking beer and playing music during the time in which they were supposed to be preparing for a qualifiers game against Uruguay. The football players were found along with volleyball players Jéssica Tejada and Yolanda Delgado. Peru failed to qualify for the 1998 World Cup.

La Charanga Habanera scandal (2002)
In 2002, during the 2002 FIFA World Cup qualifiers, a Salsa group in the VIDENA was caught entertaining the players with alcohol and music during their concentration. Additionally, women were found to have entered the concentration zone. Peru failed to qualify for this World Cup.

Hotel Golf Los Incas scandal (2007)
During the 2010 FIFA World Cup qualification season, a corruption and indiscipline scandal shook the national team as Peruvian journalists Jaime Bayly and Magaly Medina revealed that a series of Peru's most recognized players, including Claudio Pizarro, Andrés Mendoza, Santiago Acasiete, Paolo Guerrero, and Jefferson Farfán, were seen at nightclubs and parties only days before the team was scheduled to play qualifier matches. Several players were banned from playing for the national team while others were put under investigation.

The national press named the scandal in reference to the hotel in which the players were concentrating prior to the match. Banned players such as Pizarro and Farfán ended up with successful 2009 seasons while the national team suffered shame in the bottom of the South American qualifiers for the 2010 World Cup.

Panama Casino scandal (2010)
On October 12, 2010, following a friendly game against Panama, journalists from the Central American country revealed photos in which three Peru national football team players were discovered breaking their concentration in order to attend a casino. Two of the players were identified as the young midfielder Reimond Manco and the veteran defender John Galliquio. The identity of the third player was kept a mystery until local Peruvian sports newspaper El Bocón revealed it had been famous forward Jefferson Farfán. The player was accused by Manco and Galliquio of inciting the group of three to leave the concentration, despite the orders of Uruguayan coach Sergio Markarian to stay in their rooms for the remainder of their stay in Panama.

La Videna Disco scandal (2019)
On 31 December 2019, a football scandal once again erupted for the Peru football team when young star Kevin Quevedo was caught to have attended in La Videna disco party in Lima, and didn't come to train with remaining members of the Peru Olympic football team preparing for the 2020 CONMEBOL Pre-Olympic Tournament. While Quevedo was yet to be a member of senior squad, he was instigated by three other members of the senior squad, Andy Polo, Jefferson Farfán and Raúl Ruidíaz. As for the result, Kevin Quevedo was suspended from the Olympic team by the FPF while the Peru Olympic team would go on finishing bottom and failed to qualify for the 2020 Summer Olympics.

References

Peru national football team
Association football controversies